Emilio Antonio Palmero (June 13, 1895 – July 15, 1970) was a Cuban Major League Baseball pitcher. He played all or part of five seasons in the majors, spread out over a span of fourteen years from 1915 to 1928. He also pitched extensively in the minor leagues, winning 177 games over 17 minor league seasons between 1914 and 1931. Palmero spent just one full season in the majors, 1921 with the St. Louis Browns, during which he appeared in 24 games with a record of 4–7 and a 5.00 ERA.

Palmero played winter baseball in the Cuban League from 1913 to 1929. He led the league in winning percentage in 1919/20 and tied for the lead in wins in 1917. He was elected to the Cuban Baseball Hall of Fame in 1954.

Notes

References
.

External links

1895 births
1970 deaths
Major League Baseball pitchers
New York Giants (NL) players
St. Louis Browns players
Washington Senators (1901–1960) players
Boston Braves players
Major League Baseball players from Cuba
Cuban expatriate baseball players in the United States
Minor league baseball managers
Toronto Maple Leafs (International League) players
Rochester Hustlers players
Louisville Colonels (minor league) players
Little Rock Travelers players
Minneapolis Millers (baseball) players
Omaha Rourkes players
Columbus Senators players
Birmingham Barons players
Toledo Mud Hens players
Buffalo Bisons (minor league) players
Fort Worth Panthers players
Scranton Miners players
Baseball players from Havana